Daqing is a prefecture-level city in Heilongjiang, China, known for its Daqing Oil Field.

Daqing may also refer to:
Daqing Station, a railway station in South District, Taichung, Taiwan
Daqing Subdistrict, Mudanjiang, a subdistrict in Aimin District, Mudanjiang, Heilongjiang, China
Daqing Subdistrict, Bengbu, a subdistrict in Yuhui District, Bengbu, Anhui, China
Daqing Community, a community in Xinggong Subdistrict, Shahekou District, Dalian, Liaoning, China

Historical eras
Daqing (1036–1038), era name used by Emperor Jingzong of Western Xia
Daqing (1140–1143), era name used by Emperor Renzong of Western Xia
Qing dynasty (1636–1912), also known as Da Qing or Daqing

See also
Taching (disambiguation)